Trevor Pearson (born 13 October 1943) is an Australian cricketer. He played in three first-class matches for South Australia in 1969/70.

See also
 List of South Australian representative cricketers

References

External links
 

1943 births
Living people
Australian cricketers
South Australia cricketers
Cricketers from Adelaide